Amy Evans was a Welsh soprano and actress.

Amy Evans may also refer to:

Amy Burkhard Evans, American actress
Amy Evans (rugby union) (born 1990), Welsh rugby union player
Amy Evans, Cougar Town character played by Lisa Kudrow